George Post may refer to:
George Post (painter) (1906–1997), American watercolorist
George B. Post (1837–1913), American Beaux-Arts architect
George M. Post (1883–1966), American architect in Oregon
George Adams Post (1854–1925), U.S. Representative from Pennsylvania
George Edward Post (1838–1909), professor of surgery at the Syrian Protestant College in Beirut
Rue George Post, a street in Beirut, Lebanon
George Post (1914–1995), Algerian-French military pilot and international draughts player